The 2010 Oberstaufen Cup was a professional tennis tournament played on outdoor red clay courts. This was the eleventh edition of the tournament which is part of the 2010 ATP Challenger Tour. It tooj place in Oberstaufen, Germany between 5 July and 11 July 2010.

ATP entrants

Seeds

 Rankings are as of June 21, 2010.

Other entrants
The following players received wildcards into the singles main draw:
  Andreas Beck
  Peter Gojowczyk
  Kevin Krawietz
  Marcel Zimmermann

The following players received entry from the qualifying draw:
  Hans Podlipnik-Castillo
  Marek Semjan
  Marc Sieber (as a Lucky Loser)
  Cedrik-Marcel Stebe
  Robin Vik

Champions

Singles

 Martin Fischer def.  Cedrik-Marcel Stebe 6–3, 6–4

Doubles

 Frank Moser /  Lukáš Rosol def.  Hans Podlipnik-Castillo /  Max Raditschnigg 6–0, 7–5

References
Official website

Oberstaufen Cup
Clay court tennis tournaments
Oberstaufen Cup
2010 in German tennis